The 2015–16 film awards season began in November 2015 with the Gotham Independent Film Awards 2015 and ended in February 2016 with the 88th Academy Awards. Major winners for the year included The Revenant, Mad Max: Fury Road, Spotlight, Room, and Steve Jobs, among others.

Award ceremonies

Films by awards gained

References

American film awards